Vanløse is one of the 10 official districts of Copenhagen, Denmark. It lies on the western border of the municipality.  Vanløse covers an area of 6.69 km², and has a population of 36,115, making Vanløse the smallest district of Copenhagen, by population.

Neighboring city districts are:
 to the southeast is Frederiksberg municipality, which is not a part of Copenhagen municipality but rather an enclave surrounded by the municipality
 to the northeast is Bispebjerg
 to the north is Brønshøj-Husum
 to the west is Rødovre municipality, which is outside the Copenhagen municipality area
 to the south is Valby, partially separated by Damhus Lake (Damhus Sø).

Cultural references
The French artist Paul Gauguin (1848 - 1903) lived at Bogholdergården in the street Bogholder Allé during his stay in Copenhagen in 1884-1885. 
Also, the Danish artist Henry Heerup (1907 - 1993) lived for many years in the street Rødtjørnevej in Vanløse.
The local Hyltebjerg Church (Ålekistevej 89) is seen at 1:34:11 in the 1978 Olsen-banden film The Olsen Gang Sees Red.

Singer Van Morrison lived in Vanløse with his Danish girlfriend from 1980 until 1983. His song Vanlose Stairway deals with sitting on the stairs of the local station.

See also
 Vanløse station
 Telavox

References

External links

 City of Copenhagen’s statistical office
 Vanløse

Copenhagen city districts